George Rennie Hill (21 March 1921 – 1 October 2002) was a Scottish football player and manager, who played for Dundee and East Fife in the 1940s and 1950s. Hill played for Dundee in the 1952 Scottish Cup Final, which they lost 4–0 to Motherwell. In 1956, Hill became the first manager of Montrose. He held this position until 1959, when he was succeeded by Norman Christie.

References

External links

1921 births
2002 deaths
Footballers from Dundee
Scottish footballers
Association football wingers
Scottish Football League players
Dundee North End F.C. players
Dundee F.C. players
East Fife F.C. players
Scottish football managers
Scottish Football League managers
Montrose F.C. managers